The 1999–2000 season is the fourth in the history of the Glasgow Warriors as a professional side. During this season the young professional side competed as Glasgow Caledonians.

This season saw Glasgow Caledonians compete in the competitions: the Welsh-Scottish League and the European Champions Cup, the Heineken Cup.

Season Overview

Team

Coaches

Head coach:  Richie Dixon
Assistant coach:   Gordon Macpherson
Assistant coach:   Rob Moffat

Squad

Academy players

The Glasgow Thistles squad was once again sent to New Zealand in the summer of 2000.

Included in the Thistles squad are:

 Colin Shaw (Ayr)
 Graham Thomson (West of Scotland)
 Fraser Sinclair (West of Scotland)
 Graham Calder (Dalziel RFC)

Player statistics

During the 1999–2000 season, Glasgow have used 36 different players in competitive games. The table below shows the number of appearances and points scored by each player.

The statistics for the first match of the Scottish Inter-District Championship are included in the Welsh-Scottish League statistics.

Staff movements

Coaches

Personnel In
 
None.

Personnel Out

None.

Player movements

Academy promotions

Player transfers

In

 Jonathan Stuart from  Leicester Tigers
 Alan Brown from  Dundee HSFP
 Danny Herrington from  Kirkcaldy RFC
 Torquil Mathewson from  Glasgow Hawks
 Gavin Blackburn from  London Scottish
 Ashley Bond from  Sportive Ortheziene
 Roland Reid from  Golden Lions
 Craig Chalmers from  Edinburgh Reivers
 Dave Hilton from  Bath Rugby
 Alan Watt from  Currie RFC
 Andy Nicol from  Bath Rugby
 Michael Bartlett from  Canterbury
 Rory Kerr from  West of Scotland
 Ian McInroy from  West of Scotland
 Dougie Hall from  Hillhead Jordanhill
 Darren Burns from  Edinburgh Reivers
 Barry Irving from  London Scottish
 Steve Griffiths from  Leeds Tykes
 Donnie Macfadyen from  Boroughmuir

Out

 Derrick Patterson to  Stade Français
 Tom Smith to  CA Brive
 Stuart Grimes to  Newcastle Falcons
 Kevin McKenzie retirement
 Rob Wainwright retirement
 John Manson retirement
 Alan Kittle to  Musselburgh
 Guy Perrett sabbatical to focus on medical studies
 Gordon Mackay to  Lyon OU
 Murray Wallace to  Boulder Colorado
 Chris Paterson to  Edinburgh Reivers
 Cameron Little to  Glasgow Hawks
 Luke Smith to  Racing 92
 John Leslie to  Munakata Sanix Blues
 Aaron Collins to  Gala
 Matt McGrandles to  Stirling County
 Chris Simmers to  Glasgow Hawks

Competitions

Pre-season and friendlies

Match 1

Glasgow Caledonians:  A Bulloch; J Craig, J Stuart, I Jardine, S Longstaff; T Hayes, A Nicol; D Hilton, G Scott, W Anderson, S Campbell, S Griffiths, G Flockhart, M Waite, G Simpson. Replacements - I McInroy, R Kerr, B Irving, G Beveridge, F Stott, Gavin Blackburn, G McIlwham,C Docherty, A Watt, D Burns, J Shaw, Torquil Mathewson, D McFadyen

Ulster: J Bell, S Bell, G Leslie, M Blair, S Bromley, A Clarke, S Coulter, J Cunningham, M Edwards, J Fitzpatrick, R Fredericks, D Topping, D Humphreys, P Johns, G Longwell, N Malone, S Mason, T McWhirter, E Miller, D O'Cuinneagain, J Topping, A Ward, R Irwin, R Weir

Match 2

Ontario: S Rodgers; J Collins, B Luke, D Daypuck, S Keenan; C Robinson, R Stickel; B Stoikos, L Gardiner, M Jacques, I Dann, M Carter, J Tomlinson, P Ross, D Swindells

Glasgow Caledonians: A Bulloch; T Mathewson, J Stuart, I Jardine, S Longstaff; T Hayes, A Nicol; G McIlwham, G Scott, W Anderson, S Griffiths, D Burns, G Flockhart, G Simpson, D McFadyen

Match 3

Uruguay A: A Ibarria, G Souza, C Arocena, De Freitas, A Vazquaz, S Arocena, E Caffera, M Brussoni, L Machado, F Victor, G Manini, F Auesperg, S Mosquera, G Laffitte, N Achard.

Glasgow Caledonians: A Bulloch, S Longstaff, I McInroy, J Stuart, R Kerr, B Irving, G Beveridge, G McIlwham, C Docherty, A Watt, S Campbell, J Petrie, J White, G Simpson, M Waite. Substitutions: W Anderson for Watt (40), G Blackburn for McIlwham (47), F Stott for Beveridge (64), T Mathewson for Longstaff (70).

Match 4

Glasgow Caledonians:B Irving; T Mathewson, A Bulloch, I Jardine, R Kerr; T Hayes, F Stott; G McIlwham, G Scott, W Anderson, S Griffiths, D Burns, J White, G Flockhart, D McFadyen. Replacements: J Stuart, Graeme Beveridge, S Campbell, M Waite, G Blackburn, A Watt, C Docherty. Used: G Beveridge for Stott, 70; AWatt for Anderson, 80.

Edinburgh Reivers:S Lang; K Milligan, M Di Rollo, K Utterson, C Sharman; S Welsh, G Burns; R McNulty, G McKelvey, B Stewart, N Hines, I Fullarton, S Scott, G Hayter, G Dall. Subs: A Common for Lang, 39; M Proudfoot for Stewart, 55; A Jacobsen for McNulty, 67; M Lee for Utterson, 70.

By winning all 3 three matches in Ontario, Glasgow won the Canadian Tri-Continental Tournament.

Scottish Inter-District Championship

Still with only Glasgow and Edinburgh remaining as professional teams in Scotland, the Tri-Series was ran again. This time however the tournament had no sponsor as Tennents had pulled out of the competition.

The first tie of the Tri-Series was held jointly with the Welsh-Scottish League. The match is shown below for convenience, however since it is also a Welsh-Scottish League match and is included in those statistics, only 2 matches for the Scottish Inter-District Championship are recorded for statistical purposes.

1999-2000 League Table

Only for completeness. The Tri-Series was run as a best of three.

Results

Round 1 / Round 13 Welsh-Scottish League

Round 2

Round 3

European Champions Cup

Pool 1

Results

Round 1

Round 2

Round 3

Round 4

Round 5

Round 6

Welsh-Scottish League

1999-2000 League Table

Results

Round 1

Round 2

Round 3

Round 4

Round 5

Round 6

Round 7

Round 8

Round 9

Round 10

Round 11

Round 12

Round 13 / Round 1 Scottish Inter-District Championship

Round 14

Round 15

Round 16

Round 17

Round 18

Round 19

Round 20

Round 21

Round 22

Competitive debuts this season

A player's nationality shown is taken from the nationality at the highest honour for the national side obtained; or if never capped internationally their place of birth. Senior caps take precedence over junior caps or place of birth; junior caps take precedence over place of birth. A player's nationality at debut may be different from the nationality shown. Combination sides like the British and Irish Lions or Pacific Islanders are not national sides, or nationalities.

Players in BOLD font have been capped by their senior international XV side as nationality shown.

Players in Italic font have capped either by their international 7s side; or by the international XV 'A' side as nationality shown.

Players in normal font have not been capped at senior level.

A position in parentheses indicates that the player debuted as a substitute. A player may have made a prior debut for Glasgow Warriors in a non-competitive match, 'A' match or 7s match; these matches are not listed.

Tournaments where competitive debut made:

Crosshatching indicates a jointly hosted match.

Sponsorship

 Scotland on Line

Official Kit Supplier

Canterbury

References

1999-2000
1999–2000 in Scottish rugby union
1999–2000 Heineken Cup